This is a list of winners and nominees of the Golden Bell Award for Best Supporting Actor in a Miniseries or Television Film.

Winners and nominees

2010s

2020s

References

Supporting Actor in a Miniseries or Television Film, Best
Television awards for Best Supporting Actor
Male television actors by award